Galarreta, also De Galarreta, is a Basque surname, connected with the village of Galarreta, Álava, Basque Country, Spain. It is prevalent in Peru and Spain.

Notable people with this surname include:
 Alfonso de Galarreta (born 1957), Spanish-Argentinian bishop
 Iñigo Ruiz de Galarreta (born 1993), Spanish footballer
 Luis Galarreta (born 1973), Peruvian politician
  Joaquin M. Galarreta Bolia (born 1979), Argentinian entrepreneur and businessman

References